This is a map and list of European countries by GDP per capita at purchasing power parity

Map of sovereign states in Europe by projected 2022 GDP (PPP) per capita based on international dollars 

An interactive map with estimated data for 2022 from the IMF, using GDP based on purchasing power parity (PPP) per capita, shown in current international dollars.

Table of sovereign states in Europe by GDP (PPP) per capita 

Below is a table of sovereign states in Europe by GDP (PPP) per capita in international dollars. Countries are ranked by their estimated 2022 figures.

Note: transcontinental countries that are partly (but not entirely) located in Europe are also shown in the table, but the values shown are for the entire country.

 estimate

See also
 List of European countries by GDP (nominal) per capita
 List of European countries by GNI (PPP) per capita
 List of sovereign states in Europe by net average wage
 List of countries by GDP (nominal) per capita
 List of countries by GDP (PPP) per capita
 List of countries by GDP (nominal)
 List of countries by GDP (PPP)

References

Sovereign